Charles Cowles-Voysey (24 June 1889 – 10 April 1981) was an English architect.

Career
Charles Voysey studied at the Architectural Association School and the UCL Bartlett School of Architecture. Between 1909 and 1912 he was articled to Horace Field and assistant to John James Burnet and to Horace Farquharson, before starting his own practice in 1912. John Brandon-Jones worked for Cowles-Voysey, became a partner in the business and finally took over the firm.

Voysey's father, the Arts and Crafts movement architect and designer C. F. A. Voysey (1857-1941), was recognized by the seminal The Studio magazine.

In 1912, Charles married Dorothea Denise Cowles (1885-1980) and amended his surname to Cowles-Voysey.

Architectural works
 White Rock Pavilion (1922), Hastings
 Bridgeton Public Halls (1924), Glasgow
 Kingsley Hall (1927), London
 1&2 Bunkers Hill, 34-42 Wildwood Road & 19 Wellgarth Road (1929), Hampstead Garden Suburb, London
 Chance Wood (1929), Sevenoaks, Kent
 Bognor Regis Town Hall (1930), Bognor Regis, West Sussex
 Municipal Offices, High Wycombe (1932), High Wycombe, Buckinghamshire 
 Worthing Town Hall (1933), Worthing, West Sussex
 Watford Town Hall (1937-1939), Watford, Hertfordshire
 Cambridge Guildhall, Peas Hill Guildhall (1939), Cambridge
 Bromley Town Hall extension (1939), Bromley, Kent
 Magistrates' Court (1939), Bromley, Kent
 Maybridge Estate (1940s), Worthing, West Sussex
 Morley College reconstruction (1958), Waterloo, London

References

20th-century English architects
1889 births
1981 deaths